Matija Đulvat (born 22 February 1976) is a Croatian futsal player who played for MNK Futsal Dinamo Zagreb and the Croatia national futsal team.

In July 2015 Đulvat has been elected chairman of Futsal Dinamo.

References

External links
UEFA profile

1976 births
Living people
Croatian men's futsal players
Croatian sports executives and administrators